Seeing Is Believing is the debut studio album by German singer Xavier Naidoo, released by Megaphon Music on 7 September 1994 in the United States.

Track listing

Release history

References

External links
 

1994 debut albums
Xavier Naidoo albums